An-Nukhailah Mosque is an historic Shi'ite Islam mosque in the town of Al Kifl, Iraq. The mosque is a complex which contains the Dhu'l Kifl Shrine, which is believed to be the tomb of the prophet Dhul-Kifl, who is considered to be Ezekiel.

History
The complex was originally a pilgrimage site for Jews as it contained the tomb of the prophet Ezekiel, built back in the 7th century. However, some narratives consider that the site has its roots on the shrine built by the prophet Abraham, indicated by the description of Imam al-Mahdi by Muhammad al-Jawad, the ninth of the Twelve Imams in the Twelver branch of Shia Islam. In 1316, the Ilkhanid Sultan Öljaitü acquired the right of guardianship over the tomb. Since then the site was restored, and renamed according to the Islamic tradition and developed as an Islamic religious site. Minarets and the mosque were erected in the same period. In a smaller room, it contains four tombs of Ezekiel's companions and tombs of the Geonim, as well as a cenotaph to Baruch ben Neriah. 

In 2014, the site, especially the minarets, were restored by the Iranian companies and the Waqf of the Shi’a community, which cost approximately 800 million dinars.

Architecture
The unique dome of the tomb has muqarnas adorned inside, and mimics the honeycomb pattern on the outside. The surface and the upper part of the wall is painted with polychrome pattern from the Ottoman period.

See also

 Islam in Iraq
 List of mosques in Iraq

References

Bibliography

External links
Official Website of An-Nukhailah Mosque
INSIDE EZEKIEL SHRINE. Babylon Jews. Retrieved January 11, 2018.

14th-century mosques
Shia mosques in Iraq